The Tour de France is an annual road bicycle race held over 23 days in July. Established in 1903 by newspaper L'Auto, the Tour is the most well-known and prestigious of cycling's three "Grand Tours"; the others are the Giro d'Italia and the Vuelta a España. The race usually covers approximately 3,500 kilometres (2,200 mi), passing through France and neighbouring countries such as Belgium. The race is broken into day-long segments, called stages. Individual finishing times for each stage are totalled to determine the overall winner at the end of the race.

The course changes every year, but has always finished in Paris; since 1975 it has finished along the Champs-Élysées. The start of the course is known as the Grand Départ. Since the 1950s it has typically taken place in a different town each year, and since the 1970s it has been common to award the Grand Départ to cities outside France as a way of increasing international interest in the competition and the sport. The right to host the Grand Départ is now highly sought after, with cities bidding to host, and has been shown to increase economic activity as well as interest in cycling in the host area.

Host cities

Notes and references

Bibliography

See also
List of Tour de France secondary classification winners
Yellow jersey statistics
List of Grand Tour general classification winners

Tour de France-related lists
Grands Départs